The DVD6C Licensing Agency or DVD6C Licensing Group is an industry consortium which licenses a portfolio of patents required to produce DVD discs, players, drives, recorders, decoders, and encoders.

The group comprises 9  members: Hitachi, JVC, Matsushita (Panasonic), Mitsubishi, Sanyo, Sharp, Toshiba,  Warner Home Video and Samsung.

See also
 Patent pool
 MPEG LA
 Avanci

References

External links
 DVD6C Licensing Agency

Patent pools
Technology consortia
DVD